Pages is the sixth studio album by Japanese boy band Sexy Zone, released via Pony Canyon on March 13, 2019. It is the follow-up to their 2018 album XYZ=Repainting and is a concept album based around "one page of life" and expressing various emotions. It debuted at number one on both the Oricon Albums Chart and Billboard Japans Hot Albums chart, selling over 120,000 copies in its first week.

Release
Pages was released in three formats: two limited editions (A and B), and a regular edition. The regular edition includes a bonus disc with a solo song from each member, while limited edition A features a making-of and the music video for the first track "La Sexy Woman", and limited edition B features a DVD with Sexy Zone's "Lake Fuji Trip" documentary.

Singles
The album features the Oricon Singles Chart number-one singles "Innocent Days" and "Karakuri Darake no Tenderness"/"Suppin Kiss".

Track listing

Charts

Weekly charts

Year-end charts

References

2019 albums
Sexy Zone albums
Japanese-language albums